Dubai Opera is a 2,000-seat, multi-format, performing arts centre, which is located within The Opera District in Downtown Dubai. It was developed by Emaar Properties to host a variety of performances and events including theatre, opera, ballet, concerts, conferences and exhibitions. Its plans were announced by Sheikh Mohammed bin Rashid Al Maktoum in March 2012 and it was completed in 2016. It opened on 31 August 2016 with a performance by Plácido Domingo. The first season featured Bizet's The Pearl Fishers opera and also the legendary tenor José Carreras. This floor can be hired for weddings, gala dinners, fashion shows and exhibitions.

History
In January 2015, Emaar named Jasper Hope as the Chief Executive of Dubai Opera. Hope was the COO of London's Royal Albert Hall. Consolidated Contractors Company (CCC) was the main contractor for the development, having worked with Emaar in building the Dubai Mall.

An earlier proposal to build a cultural centre on an island in the Dubai Creek designed by architect Zaha Hadid was announced in 2008 and shelved during the property crash in Dubai. This venue, located in The Lagoons, would have accommodated an opera house with a 2,500 seating capacity, an 800-seat playhouse, a  arts gallery, a performing arts school, and a '6-star' themed hotel. There is a free parking and paid parking for visitors of Dubai Opera. The Paid Parking is known as Green Parking.

The first Emirati singer to appear at Dubai Opera was Hussain Al Jassmi on 10 October 2016.

Shortly after that, the award-winning hit musical Les Misérables graced the stage for a three-week run.

In 2017 the venue staged the inaugural BBC Proms Dubai - just the second time ever that the United Kingdom's premier classical music series hosted events abroad in its 112-year history.

Dubai Opera's longest running show was the Phantom of the Opera in late 2019.

In just under 4 years of operating, Dubai Opera has won a number of awards including 'Best Theatrical Performance' at the Timeout Dubai Nightlife Awards 2017 for Les Misérables, 'Favorite Show' at the 2017 What's On Awards Dubai for Les Misérables, and 'Best Theatrical Performance' at the Timeout Dubai Music and Nightlife Awards 2019 for Othello. Recognition was also given at the Timeout Dubai Music and Nightlife Awards 2019 to Dubai Opera's Chief Executive Jasper Hope, where he was presented with the highly prestigious 'Outstanding Contribution' award.

As per 2023, the Italian cultural manager Paolo Petrocelli serves as the Head of Dubai Opera.

Building
Dubai Opera is part of The Opera District within Downtown Dubai. The 1901-seat performing arts centre was designed by Janus Rostock of Atkins. The theatre was conceived and briefed by Theatre Projects Consultants, it can be converted into a traditional theatre, concert hall, banquet hall or exhibition space. Using hydraulic lifts and seating wagons to relocate 900 of the 2,000 seats, the space can be used for other events while the extra seating is stored in garages beneath the theatre.

Dubai Opera is designed to resemble a dhow, a traditional sailing vessel, in which the 'bow' of the structure houses the opera's main stage, orchestra and seating, while the elongated 'hull' has waiting areas, taxi drop-off areas, and parking. It also boasts a rooftop restaurant with views of the Burj Khalifa.

The Opera District
The Opera District was launched by Emaar Properties in Downtown Dubai in 2013. Aside from Dubai Opera, the district, which faces Burj Khalifa and The Dubai Fountain, includes art galleries, museums, design studios, and other cultural venues. The area includes several hotels, a retail plaza, recreational spaces and residential towers.

Dubai has more than 50 art galleries and hosts cultural events such as Dubai Design Week, Art Dubai, and the SIKKA Art Fair.

See also
Art in Dubai
Culture of Dubai

References

Opera houses in the United Arab Emirates
Architecture in Dubai
Performing arts centres
Cultural infrastructure completed in 2016
2016 establishments in the United Arab Emirates
Theatres completed in 2016